In mathematics, an involution, involutory function, or self-inverse function is a function  that is its own inverse,

 

Equivalently, applying  twice produces the original value.

General properties
Any involution is a bijection.

The identity map is a trivial example of an involution. Examples of nontrivial involutions include negation, reciprocation, and complex conjugation in arithmetic; reflection, half-turn rotation, and circle inversion in geometry; complementation in set theory; and reciprocal ciphers such as the ROT13 transformation and the Beaufort polyalphabetic cipher.

The composition  of two involutions f and g is an involution if and only if they commute: .

Involutions on finite sets
The number of involutions, including the identity involution, on a set with  elements is given by a recurrence relation found by Heinrich August Rothe in 1800:
The first few terms of this sequence are 1, 1, 2, 4, 10, 26, 76, 232 ; these numbers are called the telephone numbers, and they also count the number of Young tableaux with a given number of cells.
The number  can also be expressed by non-recursive formulas, such as the sum

The number of fixed points of an involution on a finite set and its number of elements have the same parity. Thus the number of fixed points of all the involutions on a given finite set have the same parity. In particular, every involution on an odd number of elements has at least one fixed point. This can be used to prove Fermat's two squares theorem.

Involution throughout the fields of mathematics

Pre-calculus
Some basic examples of involutions include the functions

the composition 
and more generally the function
 
is an involution for constants  and  that satisfy  

These are not the only pre-calculus involutions. Another one within the positive reals is

The graph of an involution (on the real numbers) is symmetric across the line . This is due to the fact that the inverse of any general function will be its reflection over the line . If, in particular, the function is an involution, then its graph is its own reflection.

Other elementary involutions are useful in solving functional equations.

Euclidean geometry
A simple example of an involution of the three-dimensional Euclidean space is reflection through a plane. Performing a reflection twice brings a point back to its original coordinates.

Another involution is reflection through the origin; not a reflection in the above sense, and so, a distinct example.

These transformations are examples of affine involutions.

Projective geometry
An involution is a projectivity  of period 2, that is, a projectivity that interchanges pairs of points.
 Any projectivity that interchanges two points is an involution.
 The three pairs of opposite sides of a complete quadrangle meet any line (not through a vertex) in three pairs of an involution. This theorem has been called Desargues's Involution Theorem. Its origins can be seen in Lemma IV of the lemmas to the Porisms of Euclid in Volume VII of the Collection of Pappus of Alexandria.
 If an involution has one fixed point, it has another, and consists of the correspondence between harmonic conjugates with respect to these two points. In this instance the involution is termed "hyperbolic", while if there are no fixed points it is "elliptic". In the context of projectivities, fixed points are called double points.

Another type of involution occurring in projective geometry is a polarity which is a correlation of period 2.

Linear algebra

In linear algebra, an involution is a linear operator T on a vector space, such that . Except for in characteristic 2, such operators are diagonalizable for a given basis with just 1s and −1s on the diagonal of the corresponding matrix. If the operator is orthogonal (an orthogonal involution), it is orthonormally diagonalizable.

For example, suppose that a basis for a vector space V is chosen, and that e1 and e2 are basis elements. There exists a linear transformation f which sends e1 to e2, and sends e2 to e1, and which is the identity on all other basis vectors. It can be checked that  for all x in V. That is, f is an involution of V.

For a specific basis, any linear operator can be represented by a matrix T. Every matrix has a transpose, obtained by swapping rows for columns. This transposition is an involution on the set of matrices.  Since elementwise complex conjugation is an independent involution, the conjugate transpose or Hermitian adjoint is also an involution.

The definition of involution extends readily to modules. Given a module M over a ring R, an R endomorphism f of M is called an involution if f 2 is the identity homomorphism on M.

Involutions are related to idempotents; if 2 is invertible then they correspond in a one-to-one manner.

In functional analysis, Banach *-algebras and C*-algebras are special types of Banach algebras with involutions.

Quaternion algebra, groups, semigroups
In a quaternion algebra, an (anti-)involution is defined by the following axioms: if we consider a transformation  then it is an involution if
  (it is its own inverse)
 

An anti-involution does not obey the last axiom but instead
 

This former law is sometimes called antidistributive. Taken as an axiom, it leads to the notion of semigroup with involution, of which there are natural examples that are not groups, for example square matrix multiplication (i.e. the full linear monoid) with transpose as the involution.

Ring theory

In ring theory, the word involution is customarily taken to mean an antihomomorphism that is its own inverse function.
Examples of involutions in common rings:
 complex conjugation on the complex plane
 multiplication by j in the split-complex numbers
 taking the transpose in a matrix ring.

Group theory
In group theory, an element of a group is an involution if it has order 2; i.e. an involution is an element  such that  and a2 = e, where e is the identity element.

Originally, this definition agreed with the first definition above, since members of groups were always bijections from a set into itself; i.e., group was taken to mean permutation group. By the end of the 19th century, group was defined more broadly, and accordingly so was involution.

A permutation is an involution precisely if and only if it can be written as a finite product of disjoint transpositions.

The involutions of a group have a large impact on the group's structure. The study of involutions was instrumental in the classification of finite simple groups.

Coxeter groups are groups generated by involutions with the relations determined only by relations given for pairs of the generating involutions. Coxeter groups can be used, among other things, to describe the possible regular polyhedra and their generalizations to higher dimensions.

Mathematical logic 
The operation of complement in Boolean algebras is an involution. Accordingly, negation in classical logic satisfies the law of double negation: ¬¬A is equivalent to A.

Generally in non-classical logics, negation that satisfies the law of double negation is called involutive. In algebraic semantics, such a negation is realized as an involution on the algebra of truth values. Examples of logics which have involutive negation are Kleene and Bochvar three-valued logics, Łukasiewicz many-valued logic, fuzzy logic IMTL, etc. Involutive negation is sometimes added as an additional connective to logics with non-involutive negation; this is usual, for example, in t-norm fuzzy logics.

The involutiveness of negation is an important characterization property for logics and the corresponding varieties of algebras. For instance, involutive negation characterizes Boolean algebras among Heyting algebras. Correspondingly, classical Boolean logic arises by adding the law of double negation to intuitionistic logic. The same relationship holds also between MV-algebras and BL-algebras (and so correspondingly between Łukasiewicz logic and fuzzy logic BL), IMTL and MTL, and other pairs of important varieties of algebras (resp. corresponding logics).

In the study of binary relations, every relation has a converse relation. Since the converse of the converse is the original relation, the conversion operation is an involution on the category of relations. Binary relations are ordered through inclusion. While this ordering is reversed with the complementation involution, it is preserved under conversion.

Computer science 
The XOR bitwise operation with a given value for one parameter is an involution. XOR masks were once used to draw graphics on images in such a way that drawing them twice on the background reverts the background to its original state. The NOT bitwise operation is also an involution, and is a special case of the XOR operation where one parameter has all bits set to 1.

Another example is a bit mask and shift function operating on color values stored as integers, say in the form RGB, that swaps R and B, resulting in the form BGR.
f(f(RGB))=RGB, f(f(BGR))=BGR.

The RC4 cryptographic cipher is an involution, as encryption and decryption operations use the same function.

Practically all mechanical cipher machines implement a reciprocal cipher, an involution on each typed-in letter.
Instead of designing two kinds of machines, one for encrypting and one for decrypting, all the machines can be identical and can be set up (keyed) the same way.

See also 
 Automorphism
 Idempotence
 ROT13

References

Further reading
 
 
 

Algebraic properties of elements
Functions and mappings